The Diocese of Southern Malawi is one of the four diocese in Malawi within the Church of the Province of Central Africa: the current bishop is Alinafe Kalemba.

References

Anglicanism in Malawi
Southern Malawi